370th may refer to:

370th Air Expeditionary Wing, provisional United States Air Force unit assigned to United States Air Forces Central
370th Fighter Group or 140th Operations Group, unit of the Colorado Air National Guard, stationed at Buckley Air Force Base, Aurora, Colorado
370th Fighter Squadron, inactive United States Army Air Forces unit
370th Flight Test Squadron, United States Air Force unit assigned to the 413th Flight Test Group, stationed at Edwards AFB, California
370th Infantry Regiment (United States), the designation for one of the infantry regiments of the 93rd (Provisional) Infantry Division

See also
370 (number)
370, the year 370 (CCCLXX) of the Julian calendar
370 BC